Valentin Peter Feuerstein (1917–1999), also known as Peter Valentin Feuerstein, was a German painter and stained-glass artist who created windows for major churches in Germany, including the Ulmer Münster, the Freiburger Münster and the Überwasserkirche in Münster.

Career 
Born in Neckarsteinach, Valentin Peter Feuerstein was the son of a commercial painter and grew up in a Catholic family. After he completed his apprenticeship to be a painter like his father, he was drafted into the Arbeitsdienst in 1938, and afterwards into the Luftwaffe. He was posted to Munich, where he was able to study at the Akademie der Bildenden Künste München. When he spent time in Italy during World War II, he was inspired to focus on artistic painting instead of taking over his father's business. After the war, he first worked as a restoration artist. In 1948, he rediscovered an altar in Windsheim which he was able to attribute to Tilman Riemenschneider.

Feuerstein focused on stained-glass windows for churches, making his first window in 1955 for a funeral chapel in his hometown, titled "Die Engel des Jüngsten Gerichts" (The angels of the Last Judgment). In a long career, he created around 840 windows in 139 locations, including five windows for the Ulmer Münster (19791986) and a rosette at the Freiburger Münster (1971). A 1985 window in the Ulmer Münster depicts the mathematicians and physicists Nicolaus Copernicus, Galileo Galilei, Johannes Kepler, Isaac Newton and Albert Einstein. The seven windows in Münster are mostly in the choir of the Gothic church and focus on biblical themes. Feuerstein created windows in the Protestant  in Bahlingen. In  in Pforzheim, which was destroyed in World War II, he created windows related to the history of the town.

In 1990, Feuerstein was awarded the Order of Merit of the Federal Republic of Germany. He died in Heidelberg.

References

External links 

 Chorgemälde von Peter Valentin Feuerstein St. Georgen, Tennenbronn

20th-century German painters
20th-century German male artists
German stained glass artists and manufacturers
Recipients of the Cross of the Order of Merit of the Federal Republic of Germany
1917 births
1999 deaths
Artists from Hesse
Reich Labour Service members
Luftwaffe personnel of World War II